Below is a list of squads used in the 2018 Africa Women Cup of Nations. The squad listings were announced on 16 November 2018.

Group A

Ghana
Ghana named their squad on 11 November 2018.

Head coach: Bashir Hayford

Algeria
Head coach: Radia Fertoul

Mali
Mali named their squad on 14 November 2018.

Head coach: Houssein Saloum

Cameroon
Cameroon named their squad on 9 November 2018.

Head coach: Joseph Ndoko

Group B

Nigeria
Nigeria named their squad on 9 November 2018.

Head coach:  Thomas Dennerby

South Africa
South Africa named their squad on 7 November 2018.

Head coach: Desiree Ellis

Zambia
Zambia named their squad on 6 November 2018.

Head coach: Bruce Mwape

Equatorial Guinea
Head coach:  Jean-Paul Mpila

Notes

References

2018 Africa Women Cup of Nations
Women's Africa Cup of Nation's squads